Guddu Premchand (born 2 September 1960) is an Indian politician, belonging to Indian National Congress. Earlier he was a member of Indian National Congress, but later on 2 November 2018 he joined BJP. However, he re-joined the Congress party once again on 31 March 2020.
 
In the 2009 election he was elected to the 15th Lok Sabha from the Ujjain Lok Sabha constituency of Madhya Pradesh.

He was also member of Madhya Pradesh legislative Assembly for two terms between 1998 and 2008.

Personal life
He is a farmer and business person and resides at Indore. He is married to Asha Borasi and has three daughters and one son.

References

External links

India MPs 2009–2014
1960 births
Living people
Politicians from Indore
Madhya Pradesh MLAs 1998–2003
Madhya Pradesh MLAs 2003–2008
Bharatiya Janata Party politicians from Madhya Pradesh
Indian National Congress politicians from Madhya Pradesh
Lok Sabha members from Madhya Pradesh
People from Ujjain district